Alena Tseliapushkina (born 22 January 1969 in Korchevjina) is a Belarusian equestrian. At the 2012 Summer Olympics she competed in the Individual eventing.

References

External links
 

Belarusian female equestrians
1969 births
Living people
Olympic equestrians of Belarus
Equestrians at the 2008 Summer Olympics
Equestrians at the 2012 Summer Olympics